The Saint Mary Spires football program is a college football team that represents University of Saint Mary in the Kansas Collegiate Athletic Conference, a part of the NAIA.  The team has had 4 head coaches since the school restarted the program in 2000. The current coach is Jay Osborne, who took the post as interim coach in 2014 after Lance Hinson left for McMurry University.

Some records show occasional one and two-game seasons being played as far back as 1899 and then sporadically until 1968.  No coach is listed for those seasons.  Another source mentions that former Green Bay Packers player Dukes Duford coached at Saint Mary and in 1930 coached the team to a conference championship.

Key

Coaches
Statistics correct as of the end of the 2021 college football season.

See also

 Lists of people from Kansas
 List of Kansas Collegiate Athletic Conference people

Notes

References

Lists of college football head coaches

Kansas sports-related lists